The 2nd Australian Academy of Cinema and Television Arts Awards (generally known as AACTA Awards) are a series of awards which includes the 2nd AACTA Awards Luncheon, the 2nd AACTA Awards ceremony and the 2nd AACTA International Awards. The former two events were held at the Star Event Centre, in Sydney, New South Wales on 28 January and 30 January 2013, respectively. Presented by the Australian Academy of Cinema and Television Arts (AACTA), the awards celebrated the best in Australian feature film, television, documentary and short film productions of 2012. The AACTA Awards ceremony was televised on Network Ten. Actor Russell Crowe hosted the show. These awards are a continuum of the Australian Film Institute Awards (known as the AFI Awards), established in 1958 and presented until 2010, which was rebranded the AACTA Awards when the Australian Film Institute (AFI) established AACTA in 2011.

On 9 May 2012, the Academy revealed a new category for Best Reality Television Series, due to a growth in reality programming in Australia. The recipient of the Raymond Longford Award was Al Clark, for his work as a film producer, and the Byron Kennedy Award was handed out posthumously to Sarah Watt. The nominees were announced during a press conference on 3 December 2012. The Sapphires won eleven of the thirteen film awards it was nominated for, including Best Film, Best Direction, Best Actor, Best Actress and Best Supporting Actress. Other feature film winners were Wish You Were Here with two awards, and Lore, Not Suitable for Children and Iron Sky with one. In the television categories Howzat! Kerry Packer's War and Redfern Now won two awards, and A Moody Christmas, The Adventures of Figaro Pho, Agony Aunts, The Amazing Race Australia, Jack Irish: Bad Debts, Lowdown, Puberty Blues, Rake and Underbelly: Badness with one.

Background
On 5 May 2012, the Academy announced a new category for Best Reality Television Series, due to the growth of reality television productions in Australia. Reality television productions could previously be submitted in the Best Light Entertainment Series category. The twenty-three films eligible to compete for film awards were revealed on 29 August 2012. Of those competing, Burning Man was made eligible, after being ineligible to compete at the previous awards due to a change in release date. The details of the first nominees were also announced that day, in the non-feature film categories for: Best Feature Length Documentary, Best Short Fiction Film and Best Short Animation, as determined by specially formed juries. Round one of voting took place between 5 October and 8 November 2012 to determine the winners of the aforementioned categories, and to decide the nominees in the feature-film awards. For television, juries were established to select the nominees and winners.

On 3 December 2012, the full list of nominees for feature-film, television and non-feature films were released during a press conference in Sydney. Of the nominees, The Sapphires (2012) received the most feature-film nominations with twelve, including Best Film, Best Direction for Wayne Blair, Best Adapted Screenplay for Keith Thompson and Tony Briggs, Best Lead Actor for Chris O'Dowd, Best Lead Actress for Deborah Mailman and Best Supporting Actress for Jessica Mauboy. In television, Puberty Blues received the most nominations with six. These include Best Drama Series, Best Actress - Drama for Ashleigh Cummings, Best Guest or Supporting Actor - Drama for Daniel Wyllie, and Best Guest or Supporting Actress - Drama for Susan Prior. Round two of voting, to determine the feature-film award winners, commenced on the day of the nominations announcement, and concluded on 13 December 2012.

Special awards
A call for recommendations, for the Raymond Longford Award, was made on 13 September 2012 with the submission period ending on 28 September. It was announced on 22 November Al Clark will receive the award, for his work as a film producer, at the AACTA Awards Luncheon in 2013. The Byron Kennedy Award was presented posthumously to Sarah Watt, an Australian film director. Watt was chosen for: "her brave, innovative filmmaking. Painter, photographer, animator, she brought consummate skill and elegance to the live action form. Without pretension, her work broke all the rules, yet her singular view connected to a wide audience by its profound emotional honesty." The accolade was presented at the AACTA Awards Ceremony to her son Clem.

Ceremony
The AACTA Awards Luncheon and Ceremony were held at The Star Event Centre in Sydney, New South Wales on 28 and 30 January, respectively. The AACTA Awards Luncheon, which handed out awards for technical achievements across film and television, as well as all non-feature categories, was hosted by Adam Elliot. The AACTA Awards Ceremony, presenting honours in all other categories, was originally to be presided over by Hugh Sheridan, but due to conflicting schedules he was replaced by Russell Crowe. The latter presentation which had been previously shown on Nine Network since 2005, aired on Network Ten on the day of the ceremony, but as an edited version of the event.

Winners and nominees

Feature film
Winners will be listed first and highlighted in boldface.

Television

Non-feature film

Additional awards

Productions with multiple nominations

Feature film

The following feature films received multiple nominations.

Twelve: The Sapphires
Ten: Burning Man
Eight: Lore, Mental and Wish You Were Here
Four: Not Suitable for Children
Two: 33 Postcards and Killer Elite

The following feature films received multiple awards.

 Eleven: The Sapphires
 Two: Wish You Were Here

Television

The following television shows received multiple nominations.

 Six: Puberty Blues
 Five: Howzat! Kerry Packer's War and Redfern Now
 Three: A Moody Christmas
 Two: The Amazing Race Australia, Beaconsfield, Devil's Dust, Lowdown, Rake and Underground: The Julian Assange Story

The following television shows received multiple awards.

 Two: Howzat! Kerry Packer's War and Redfern Now

See also
2nd AACTA International Awards

References

External links
 The Australian Academy of Cinema and Television Arts Official website

AACTA Awards ceremonies
AACTA Film Awards
AACTA Film Awards